Rich Wright is an American football coach. He is currently the head football coach at Northwest Missouri State University in Maryville, Missouri, a position he has held since December 2016. From 1991 to 1994, Wright held several assistant coaching jobs in Nebraska and New York. In 1995, Wright became a graduate assistant for Northwest Missouri State, where he was earning his master's degree, for two seasons. In 1997, Wright moved to South Dakota for an assistant coaching job. Following South Dakota, Wright spent time in Missouri and Iowa, before returning to Missouri in 2004. In 2004, Wright became the defensive line coach and coordinator of special teams at Northwest Missouri State, and eventually moved to defensive coordinator and assistant head coach in 2011. In December 2016 after winning the National Championship – Wright's fourth – Wright was named the program's 20th head football coach.

Head coaching record

References

External links
 Northwest Missouri State profile

Year of birth missing (living people)
Living people
Central Methodist Eagles football coaches
Cortland Red Dragons football coaches
Dakota State Trojans football coaches
Dana Vikings football coaches
Northwest Missouri State Bearcats football coaches
St. Ambrose Fighting Bees football coaches
William Penn Statesmen football coaches
Dana College alumni
People from Hamilton, New York